Ingo Brigandt is a German Canadian philosopher and Canada Research Chair in Philosophy of Biology at the University of Alberta. 
He is an executive editor of the Canadian Journal of Philosophy and an associate editor of Journal of Experimental Zoology Part B: Molecular and Developmental Evolution. 
Brigandt has held various grants and fellowships from the Andrew Mellon Foundation, Social Sciences and Humanities Research Council, Konrad Lorenz Institute for Evolution and Cognition Research, and the University of Alberta.

See also
 Heterochrony
 Reductionism 
 Gavin de Beer 
 Modern synthesis (20th century)
 Homology (biology) 
 Evolutionary developmental biology 
 Antireductionism

References

External links
Ingo Brigandt at the University of Alberta
Ingo Brigandt, Google Scholar

Philosophy academics
Living people
Philosophy journal editors
Academic staff of the University of Alberta
Canadian philosophers
Year of birth missing (living people)
University of Pittsburgh alumni
University of Konstanz alumni
Philosophers of science
Canada Research Chairs
Philosophers of mind